The Nontron knife is a traditional wooden-handled knife manufactured in the village of Nontron in the Dordogne area of southern France, in a tradition said to date back to the 15th century. The handle is usually of boxwood.

Description
Nontron knives are decorated with pokerwork designs based on a distinctive logo, and are now highly prized as a style item. The Nontron penknife is similar in appearance to the cheaper and much more widespread Opinel knife, though the blades and handles are more various in shape. 

Nontron also manufacture a variety of table cutlery, chefs knives, and carving knives. Many of these use the traditional boxwood handle but others use more modern materials compatible with dishwashers.

References

Pocket knives